Super Rugby is a men's professional rugby union club competition involving teams from Australia, Fiji, New Zealand, and the Pacific Islands. It previously included teams from Argentina, Japan, and South Africa. Building on various Southern Hemisphere competitions dating back to the South Pacific Championship in 1986, with teams from a number of southern nations, the Super Rugby started as the Super 12 in the 1996 season with 12 teams from 3 countries: Australia, New Zealand, and South Africa. The Super 12 was established by SANZAR after the sport became professional in 1995. At its peak the tournament featured the top players from nations representing 16 of the 24 top-three finishes in the history of the Rugby World Cup. After the COVID-19 pandemic forced the competition to split into three, the reformed competition in 2021 and beyond will only include Oceanian clubs representing Australia, New Zealand and from the Pacific islands (specifically a Fijian team, and a New Zealand-based Pacifika side representing Samoan, Tongan and other Pacific communities).

The name was changed to Super 14 with the addition of two teams for the 2006 season, and with expansion to 15 teams in the three countries for the 2011 season, the competition was rebranded as Super Rugby (with no number). In 2016 two new teams, the Jaguares from Argentina and Sunwolves from Japan, joined the competition, playing in two newly separated African groups.

In 2018, the competition underwent another change in format, this time dropping two teams (the Cheetahs and Kings) from the South African conference, and one (Western Force) from the Australian conference. This left the competition with 15 teams.

The Sunwolves left the competition for financial reasons before the conclusion of the 2020 season. The 2020 Super Rugby season was subsequently cancelled due to the COVID-19 pandemic, and this led to a mass-scale restructuring of the competition. Due to international travel restrictions relating to the pandemic, the competition was unable to resume in its multinational format, prompting Rugby Australia and New Zealand Rugby to launch domestic tournaments, Super Rugby AU and Super Rugby Aotearoa respectively. Both these tournaments will continue in 2021, to be followed by Super Rugby Trans-Tasman, a crossover tournament.

In September 2020, the South African Rugby Union announced the withdrawal of their four Super Rugby franchises from the competition, with plans for them to join an expanded PRO14 (which would become the United Rugby Championship). The Argentinian Jaguares also would take no further part in Super Rugby competitions.

The long-term future of Super Rugby in 2022 and beyond was confirmed in August 2021, with a 12-team format confirmed. The competition sees the addition of a Fijian side and a team representing the Pacific Islands, and will return to a format similar to what was played pre-COVID-19 pandemic. The tournament for 2022 and 2023 will be named Super Rugby Pacific.

The competition has been dominated by New Zealand teams, who have won 18 times in 26 years. The  have won most often, with 11 titles.

Organisation and format

SANZAAR

SANZAAR is the body that administers Super Rugby, and has the Australian, New Zealand, South African and Argentine rugby unions as its sole members. SANZAAR also runs the Rugby Championship tournament that is contested by Argentina, Australia, New Zealand, and South Africa following the conclusion of the Super Rugby tournament; the Tri-Nations preceded the Rugby Championship before Argentina joined the competition. The organisation was formed in 1996 to establish and run the Super 12, and Tri-Nations Tournament.

Competition format

Prior to 2011, Super Rugby was a round-robin competition where each team played with every other team once; a team had six or seven home games, and six or seven away games each. The winner received four competition points; if the game was a draw two points were awarded to each team. The Rugby union bonus points system was also used, where any team scoring four or more tries, and/or losing by seven points or less, receives an extra competition point. In 2016, the try bonus changed. A team now has to score three more tries than their opponents. The top four teams at the end of the round-robin phase then played semi-finals – the first placed team hosting the fourth placed team, and the second placed team hosting the third placed team. The two winners then played the final at the home ground of the top surviving seed. There were 91 regular season games in total. Games were held over 14 weekends with each team receiving one bye.

From 2011 – 2015 the format changed, with each country forming its own conference. Each team within a conference played each of the other teams in its conference twice, once at home and once away. Each team then played four out of the five teams from each of the other conferences once. Competition points were awarded on a similar basis as before. The format of the finals also changed; it involved six teams: the top team in each of the three conferences plus the three next teams with the highest total number of points, regardless of conference. The four lower ranking teams were paired in two sudden death games; the winners of those two games each played one of the two top ranked teams (which received a bye at the start of the finals). Those winners played for the championship.

For the 2016 and 2017 seasons the format changed again, with three more teams joining, one each from Argentina, Japan and South Africa. There were four conferences, with Africa getting two conferences. The finals had eight teams with each conference winner getting a home quarter final. They were joined by four wild card teams, three from the Australasian group and one from the South African group.

From the 2018 season the format changed again, with two South African teams and an Australian team being dropped. There were three conferences, one containing the five New Zealand teams, a South African one including Argentina's team and an Australian one including Japan's team.

Due to the COVID-19 pandemic the competition had to undergo a change in structure and be split into regionalised tournaments. There are currently two national competitions, Australia's Super Rugby AU and New Zealand's Super Rugby Aotearoa, and those followed by Super Rugby Trans-Tasman in 2021, a crossover competition involving the five Australian sides playing the five New Zealand sides. Super Rugby currently only consists of Australian and New Zealand sides, with the Japanese Sunwolves departing the competition after the 2020 season, the South African sides voting to leave to join an expanded PRO14 (Later known as the United Rugby Championship), and the Argentinian Jaguares not set to compete in any Super Rugby tournament in 2021.

From 2022, the tournament will revert to round robin format featuring 12 teams, with the Fijian Drua and Moana Pasifika joining the competition. There will be no divisions from 2022 onwards, with one main log being used instead, and top 8 teams qualifying for the playoffs.

History

Background
Before 1996, a number of transnational competitions involving regional and provincial rugby union teams had taken shape in the southern hemisphere. The earliest of these was the South Pacific Championship, which was launched in 1986 and continued until 1990.

Super 6
After the demise of the South Pacific Championship, with no tournament played in 1991, the competition was relaunched as the Super 6 in 1992. The original Super 6 competition consisted of three provincial teams from New Zealand: Auckland, Canterbury, Wellington; along with two Australian state teams: Queensland and New South Wales; and also the Fiji national team.

Super 10

In 1993, the Super Six competition was revamped and expanded into the Super 10 tournament. With South Africa being readmitted into international sport following the dismantling of apartheid, there was an opportunity to launch an expanded competition which would also feature South Africa's top provincial teams. The inaugural competition featured the following teams: Waikato, Auckland, Otago and North Harbour (New Zealand); Natal, Transvaal and Northern Transvaal (South Africa); Queensland and New South Wales (Australia) and Western Samoa (Pacific Tri-Nations winner). The Super 10 was won by Transvaal (South Africa) in 1993, and by Queensland (Australia) in 1994 and 1995.

SANZAR era

Super 12 (1995–2005)
The official declaration of professionalism in rugby union in August 1995 led to a restructuring of the Super 10 competition. Following the success of the 1995 World Cup, the rugby boards of Australia, New Zealand and South Africa formed SANZAR (South African, New Zealand and Australian Rugby) to administer an annual 12-team provincial/franchise based competition pitting regional teams from the three nations against each other. In addition it was decided to hold an annual Tri-Nations Test Series between the three countries. A significant reason for the development of the Super 12 was the threat to rugby union from rival football code rugby league: part of the business model for the Foxtel pay TV network in Australia was to attract subscribers by offering an exclusive product (such as rugby union) which could not be seen on free-to-air broadcast television. By setting up the Super 12, the Unions had a product that was in demand from viewers, enabling them to sell a 10-year contract for exclusive television rights to News Corp for US$555 million, giving them both coverage and financial support to kickstart the new competition.

With significant sponsorship, and rugby turning a professional sport in August 1995, the Super 12 competition successfully kicked off in 1996 with five New Zealand franchises, four South African provinces and three domestic Australian teams competing. New Zealand's dominance of the competition began in the first year when the Auckland Blues won the inaugural competition defeating South African side the  45–21 in a home final. The Blues would repeat the success of 1996 beating Australian side the ACT Brumbies 23–7 in the 1997 final.

The Blues then reached their third successive final in 1998 but went down to fellow countrymen the Canterbury Crusaders 13–20. This would mark the beginning of the Crusaders' three-year dominance as they went on to win the 1999 and 2000 finals over the Otago Highlanders and ACT Brumbies respectively.

The Crusaders won their 4th final in 2002 winning all 11 matches and missed out on their 5th in 2003 with a four-point loss to fellow countrymen the Blues. In 2004 the Brumbies took revenge on their 2000 final loss to the Crusaders defeating them 47–38 in front of a home crowd. The Crusaders would bounce back to win the 2005 final 35–25 against the Australian side the New South Wales Waratahs who reached their first-ever final. This was the last year of the 12 team format.

From the early 2000s Australia had started to push for the inclusion of a fourth Australian team, and South Africa for another team from its country. There was also speculation of including a team from the South Pacific Island nations, such as Fiji; or a combined Pacific Islanders team from Fiji, Samoa, and Tonga. Argentina was also pushing for inclusion in the Super 12. In the early 2000s the provincial names from the New Zealand franchises were dropped, so, for example, the Canterbury Crusaders became The Crusaders. Also South Africa followed the New Zealand franchise model, where previously South African participation was decided by the previous year's Currie Cup placings.

Super 14 (2006–2010)
SANZAR announced in December 2004 that a new five-year television deal had been signed that would cover 2006 to 2010, with News Corporation winning the rights for the UK, Australia and New Zealand, and SuperSport winning rights for South Africa. The contract was worth US$323 million over five years, a 16% annual increase compared to the previous deal. It covers international fixtures as well as the Super 14. SANZAR remained free to negotiate separate deals for other markets, such as France, Japan and the Americas.

The TriNations is the "cash cow" for the SANZAR partners as it provides nearly 60 per cent of the money from News Ltd. The Super 14 made up about 30 per cent of the deal. Under the new deal, Australia and South Africa each got one extra team in the competition, and a third round of fixtures was added to the Tri Nations Series. The new Australian team in the competition was based in Perth and was named the Western Force.

The addition of the new South African team led to considerable controversy, including government involvement. Finally, the five teams for 2006 were confirmed to be the country's existing four teams plus the Cheetahs, which draws its players from the Free State and Northern Cape Provinces. For the 2007 season, the Southern Spears, based in Port Elizabeth, were originally intended to replace the lowest-finishing South African team from the 2006 competition. However, the existing South African Super 14 franchises opposed the plan, which was pushed through by controversial president of the South African Rugby Union, Brian van Rooyen. After van Rooyen was ousted as president, SARU announced that the Spears would not enter the competition. SARU investigated the viability of the Spears after discovering serious financial irregularities. A High Court of South Africa ruling stated that the Spears had a valid contract to compete in the Super 14 and Currie Cup. However, because of the organisation's financial and administrative troubles, in November 2006 a settlement was reached. The Spears abandoned their legal case, and will continue to exist, but not compete in the Super 14.

SANZAR rejected a proposal to split the Super 14 into two seven-team divisions, and decided to keep the competition in its traditional single-table format. Argentina and the Pacific Islands remained shut out of the competition.

The two new teams didn't perform all that well, the South African franchise the Cheetahs did the better of the two teams finishing 10th on the ladder notching up 5 season wins. The Australian franchise the Western Force only managed one victory and ended winning the wooden spoon as last placed 14th. The highlight for the Force was a 23-all draw against eventual champions the Crusaders, who defeated first-time finalists the Hurricanes 19–12.

During the 2007 season, 22 All Blacks missed the competition's first seven rounds as part of an All Black "conditioning programme" that was a part of the All Blacks' 2007 Rugby World Cup preparations, and every New Zealand franchise was without players for the first seven rounds.
At the end of the regular season, for the first time since 1998, no Australian franchise had made the semi-finals. Although the Brumbies were strong and the Western Force experienced vast improvement, it was a poor season for the Queensland Reds and Waratahs who finished last and second last respectively. Also, the competition featured the first all-South African final as the Sharks and Bulls, who finished 1–2 on the season ladder, both won their respective semi-finals. The final, held in Durban, saw the visiting Bulls win 20–19.

During the time the competition was branded as the Super 14, only two teams won the tournament. The Crusaders winning the 2006 and 2008 tournaments; while the Bulls ended victorious in 2007, 2009, and 2010 respectively.

Super Rugby: 15 teams (2011–2015)
SANZAR unveiled in 2009 its model for an expanded season that would begin in 2011.  This model was based around the original ARU proposal for three national conferences: each side were to have played the other four teams from their own country twice and the other ten teams once each; the season has to end with a six-team finals series.

There were four major compromises, however, designed to accommodate certain wishes of each country, that somewhat complicated the model: 
 Each team would only play four, instead of all five, teams in each of the other two national conferences, making sixteen regular season games for each team instead of eighteen, and allowing for a late February start, somewhat placating the ARU and NZRU who wanted a March start.
 There would be a three-week gap for the June test (international) matches favoured by the SARU.
 The season would finish in early August so as not to overlap new streamlined versions of New Zealand's and South Africa's domestic competitions.
 The three conference winners and the three best performers of the remaining teams would qualify for a three-week finals series, with seedings deciding the match-ups. This system is a hybrid of the conference-based qualification system favoured by the SARU and the 'top six' model favoured by the ARU and NZRU.

SANZAR announced in 2009 the addition of a fifth Australian team that would play in the expanded "Super Rugby" competition in 2011. The licence was awarded to Victoria, Australia, and the team's name announced as the Melbourne Rebels. The Australian start-up franchise was given the nod ahead of South Africa's Southern Kings.  Brian Waldron, former CEO of the NRL club the Melbourne Storm, was confirmed as the new CEO of the Rebels on 11 January 2010, but resigned on 23 April after a salary cap breach was uncovered at the Storm.

SANZAAR era

Expansion: 18 teams (2016–2017)
In February 2012, SANZAR chief executive Greg Peters announced that the organisation was considering adding franchises in Argentina, Japan and the United States in 2016, the first year of SANZAR's next television contract. This was also the year that rugby sevens entered the Olympics, which contributed towards increased interest in the sport in many countries, including Japan and the US.

Australian sports broadcasting analyst Colin Smith noted that the addition of Japanese and American teams could result in a TV deal worth more than A$1 billion beyond 2020. Specifically, he stated, "You could have a deal comparable to the other major sports in Australia. Rugby is a college (university) sport in the US, if soccer can create its own league there and sell teams for $40 million, imagine what you could do in 10–12 years with rugby in that market." By comparison, the largest TV deal in Australian sport, that of the Australian Football League (Australian rules), is worth A$1.26 billion from 2012 to 2016. Even that figure was dwarfed by the TV contracts of the NFL, for which contracts at the time were worth more than US$4 billion annually.

Peters added that the conference-based structure was ideal for expanding the competition to new territories, either by adding new conferences or by adding teams to the current conferences. He also discussed the possibility that offshore Super Rugby teams could be a home for surplus players from the SANZAR countries, keeping them in the SANZAR fold and away from European clubs.

Prior to Super Rugby's broadcast contracts expiring after the 2015 season, SANZAR considered several alternatives for the competition's future organisation:

 Retention of the conference system that was in place for 2011–15.
 Expansion of the structure to include teams from Asia, the United States and/or Canada.
 A split of the competition, with South Africa forming one competition with the likely addition of at least one Argentine side, and Australia and New Zealand forming another, with the possibility of including Asian teams.

The last proposal, made by the SARU, was reportedly driven by internal union politics. With only five guaranteed places in Super Rugby but six active franchises, the bottom team in the South African Conference faced a promotion/relegation playoff with the sixth franchise for a place in the next season's competition. Australia and New Zealand warmed to the SARU proposal, as a trans-Tasman competition would potentially allow for more regional derbies, fewer time zone complications and less player travel. However, NZRU chief executive Steve Tew indicated that a competition that did not include South African teams was a commercial non-starter because of large broadcast revenues from that country and because the NZRU considered Super Rugby matches in South Africa to be critical for national team development.

SANZAR announced on 4 September 2013 that South Africa would be granted a sixth franchise starting in the 2016 season, negating the need for relegation play-offs involving the sixth South African franchise. SANZAR then announced on 20 November 2014 that Japan and Argentina would each be allocated a team from the 2016 season onwards.

In 2017, the Australian Rugby Union was rebranded to Rugby Australia.

Contraction: 15 teams (2018–2020)
In April 2017, SANZAAR confirmed the competition would be reduced to 15 teams in 2018 with two South African and one Australian team to have their franchises withdrawn. Subsequently, four South African teams took part: the Bulls, Lions, Sharks and Stormers, with the Cheetahs and Kings losing their spots. The Cheetahs and Kings joined the Pro 12, which became the Pro14 from the 2017–2018 season onwards. On 11 August 2017, Australia announced that the Western Force had lost their licence. On 21 March 2019, SANZAAR confirmed that 2020 will be the Sunwolves last season of competition in Super Rugby.

COVID-19: Separate competitions and South African departure (2020–2021) 
The global COVID-19 pandemic caused the 2020 Super Rugby competition to be cut short. As health concerns eased, other professional sports returned to play. The Super Rugby season was unable to resumed, however, due to border restrictions and the need for teams to be placed into quarantine upon arrival in each country. This resulted in New Zealand Rugby and Rugby Australia forming their own Super Rugby tournaments starting in June and July respectively, so that their teams could compete domestically. South African Rugby subsequently launched its own domestic Super Rugby competition which started play in October 2020.

The three competitions formed were:

 Super Rugby Aotearoa (5 teams, New Zealand)
 Super Rugby AU (5 teams, Australia)
 Super Rugby Unlocked (7 teams, South Africa)

Super Rugby Aotearoa featured all five New Zealand teams from Super Rugby: the Blues, Chiefs, Crusaders, Highlanders and Hurricanes. Super Rugby AU included Australia's four teams, the Reds, Waratahs, Brumbies and Rebels, as well as former Super Rugby side, the Western Force. The Force had continued as a franchise after their 2017 post-season exclusion from Super Rugby and were playing in Global Rapid Rugby, also suspended due to COVID-19. The Australian and New Zealand competitions each scheduled a 20-game home and away season in 2020 but Super Rugby AU played two additional knockout matches to decide the Australian title.

These seven teams competed in a single round-robin domestic format in 2020.

In September 2020, SA Rugby announced the withdrawal from Super Rugby of all of their teams, with plans for the four sides to join an expanded Pro14/United Rugby Championship competition. Super Rugby Aotearoa and Super Rugby AU continued in 2021, Super Rugby Trans-Tasman would also take place in 2021, a crossover competition featuring the Australian sides playing the New Zealand sides.

Super Rugby Pacific: Fiji and the Pacific Islands join the competition (2022–) 
In the longer term, a new 12-team tournament from 2022 onwards had been mooted, with the current five Australian and five New Zealand sides to be joined by Moana Pasifika, and a Fijian side. New Zealand Rugby has confirmed that it intends to partner with Fiji Rugby and Moana Pasifika, along with Australia going forward. In April 2021, it was announced that licences had been offered to the Fijian Drua and Moana Pasifika ahead of joining Super Rugby in 2022. The new format was confirmed in August 2021, with the tournament branded as Super Rugby Pacific, with the competition returning to a round robin format, although the divisions will be replaced by one main log instead.

Current franchises

There are twelve franchises currently in Super Rugby; five from Australia, one from Fiji, five from New Zealand, and one representing the Pacific Islands. Each franchise is representing a franchise area, with each franchise in New Zealand representing a collection of unions, compared to the Australian model of one franchise per union. This model differs from the traditional club-based model of other Australian sports; with 5 Super Rugby teams in Australia compared to the 16 Australian-based National Rugby League teams and the 18 teams of the Australian Football League. The Pacific Islands franchise, Moana Pasifika, will play mainly in New Zealand during the 2022 season.

 Notes:

Former franchises 
  Bulls – Pretoria, Gauteng (withdrawn by the South African Rugby Union in 2020)
  Cats – Johannesburg, Gauteng (renamed as the Lions in 2005)
  Cheetahs – Bloemfontein, Free State (withdrawn by Super Rugby and moved to Pro14 in 2017, participated in Super Rugby Unlocked in 2020)
  Griquas – Kimberley, Northern Cape (participated in Super Rugby Unlocked in 2020)
  Jaguares – Buenos Aires, Argentina (not named in a Super Rugby competition for 2021)
  Lions – Johannesburg, Gauteng (renamed the Cats 1998, returned to Lions name 2006; withdrawn by the South African Rugby Union in 2012, returned to Super Rugby in 2014; withdrawn by the South African Rugby Union in 2020)
  Pumas – Mbombela, Mpumalanga (participated in Super Rugby Unlocked in 2020)
  Sharks – Durban, KwaZulu-Natal (withdrawn by the South African Rugby Union in 2020)
  Southern Kings – Gqeberha, Eastern Cape (withdrawn by Super Rugby and moved to Pro14 in 2017)
  Stormers – Cape Town, Western Cape (withdrawn by the South African Rugby Union in 2020)
  Sunwolves – Tokyo, Japan (withdrawn by the Japan Rugby Football Union in 2020)

Champions
 

The following sides have won Super Rugby titles since the competitions inception in 1996. 

 Notes:

Regionalised Competition winners
Due to the COVID-19 pandemic, regionalised tournaments were played for the remainder of the 2020 Super Rugby season and the 2021 Super Rugby season. Those competitions were: Super Rugby AU (Australia), Super Rugby Aotearoa (New Zealand), Super Rugby Unlocked (South Africa) and Super Rugby Trans-Tasman (Australia and New Zealand).

* South Africa withdrew from all Super Rugby competitions at the end of the 2020 Super Rugby season.

Final appearances, victories by country 

In the sortable table below, teams are ordered first by number of appearances, then by number of wins, and finally by victorious seasons.

Semi-final appearances by team

 20  Crusaders (15 wins, 5 losses)
 11  Hurricanes (3 wins, 8 losses)
 10  Brumbies (6 wins, 4 losses)
 8  Sharks (4 wins, 4 losses)
 8  Waratahs (3 wins, 5 losses)
 7  Blues (5 wins, 2 losses)
 7  Bulls (3 wins, 4 losses)
 7  Chiefs (3 wins, 4 losses)
 5  Lions (3 wins, 2 losses) (2 losses as the Cats)
 5  Highlanders (1 wins, 4 losses)
 4  Reds (1 win, 3 losses)
 4  Stormers (1 win, 3 losses)
 1  Jaguares (1 win)

Conference winners by team
Between 2011 and 2019, teams from Australia, New Zealand and South Africa have played in 3 separate conferences. With teams playing each team in their own conference twice (home and away) and in the other conferences playing four of the five teams. The winner of each conference is awarded a home final and their region specific conference trophy. In 2016, the South Africa conference was split in two, with Japan's Sunwolves and Argentina's Jaguares added to South Africa 1 and 2, respectively. In 2018, the South African conferences re-integrated, with Argentina's Jaguares remaining in the South Africa conference, and Japan's Sunwolves joining the Australia conference.

Salary cap

Australia
The five Australian teams playing in the competition are subjected to a $5.5 million salary cap for a squad of up to 40 players per Australian team. The Australian Rugby Union decided in 2011 to introduce the salary cap because of financial pressures.
Originally starting in 2012 as a cap of A$4.1 million, it was later raised to $4.5 million for the 2013 and 2014 seasons to take pressure off the teams' ability to recruit and retain players. The salary cap is a key component of the negotiation between the ARU and the Rugby Union Players Association over the collective bargaining agreement.
The fact that the Australian teams in Super Rugby face a salary cap has been attributed as a factor that makes it more difficult for Australian teams to win the title.

The cap regulations have some small concessions:
 Five players on each team may be paid $30,000 each per season by team sponsors; this amount is not included in the team cap.
 The maximum cap charge for a non-Australian player is $137,000, regardless of his actual wages.

Compared to other Australian 'rival' sporting leagues, such as the NRL and AFL, the salary cap is considerably lower. Two times lower than the AFL and only makes up %55 of the NRL salary cap. However the Australian Super Rugby salary cap stands greater than the A-League, the BBL and the NBL.

Brand and image

Trophies

There have been several iterations of the trophy awarded to the winner of the Super Rugby competitions.

The Super 14 trophy, unveiled in New Zealand ahead of the 2006 season, was made of sterling silver with the competition logo on a globe sitting atop of a four-sided twisted spiral. Jens Hansen Gold and Silversmith in Nelson, New Zealand hand-made the trophy which took over two months to complete.

On 30 June 2011, SANZAR unveiled the new trophy that will be presented to the winners of the Super Rugby final from 2011 and beyond, was crafted from solid stainless steel and polished to a mirror finish. It has a height of 65 cm and a mass of 18 kilograms.
The trophy was designed by Blue Sky Design of Sydney. The trophy was manufactured by Box and Dice Pty Ltd also based in Sydney.

SANZAR CEO Greg Peters said "The shape of the trophy is centred around three curved legs, each representing the Conferences involved in the Super Rugby competition . . . The champions trophy is the 'big one', and will become the ultimate symbol of Super Rugby supremacy in the years to come."

The colour on each leg corresponds to the Conferences with gold for Australia, black for New Zealand, and green for South Africa.

There are several other trophies contested during the competition; the Charles Anderson VC Memorial Cup between the Brumbies and Stormers, the Bob Templeton Cup between the Reds and Waratahs, the Ganbattle Trophy between Sunwolves and Rebels and the Gordon Hunter Memorial Trophy between the Blues and Highlanders.
Every year the Super Rugby player of the year is awarded.

Logo
During the last season of the Super 12, Coast Design of Sydney was commissioned to design a new logo for the Super 14. The Super 14 logo broke away from the traditional shield formats, common to many sporting codes, and used Roman numerals (XIV), which is unique for sport in the region. The game's dynamism and speed are suggested by the orbiting football which has three distinct stitches, a subtle reference to the three countries of the tournament.

The Super Rugby logo dispenses with numbers, featuring a large blue "S" with a white rugby ball in the centre and "SRY" below the "S". The three stitches of the previous ball are retained.

Before the expansion to the Super 14, the Super 12 used a logo in the shape of a shield, which had the sponsors name at the top, and then the words "Rugby" and "Super 12". The lower half of the logo used three different coloured stripes, green, black and gold, the respective colours of the national teams of South Africa, New Zealand and Australia.

Naming rights
The naming rights for the competition are different in the five countries:
 In New Zealand, Investec Bank has naming rights starting with the 2011 season, and the competition is referred to as Investec Super Rugby. During the Super 14 era, sporting goods retailer Rebel Sport had naming rights and the Super 14 competition was referred to as the Rebel Sport Super 14. Previously the naming rights holders were U-Bix and then Telecom New Zealand (TNZ). Telecom used its ISP brand Xtra as the label in their last year of holding naming rights.
 In Australia, telecommunications company Vodafone has been the title sponsor of Super Rugby since 2017 As a result, the competition is officially referred to as Vodafone Super Rugby. Prior to this, Super Rugby in Australia was sponsored by Suncorp Group through their life insurance brand Asteron Life. Vodafone were also the title sponsor of the competition during the Super 12 era. In the first season of Super Rugby, Australia had no naming rights partner. Previous to that, Investec acquired naming rights in the middle of the Super 14 era from Lion Nathan, who had named the competition the Tooheys New Super 14, after its Tooheys New beer brand. 
In South Africa, telecommunications carrier Vodacom has naming rights, and the expanded competition is referred to as Vodacom Super Rugby. Before 1999, when cigarette advertising was banned in South Africa, the competition was sponsored by Winfield.
In Argentina, telecommunications carrier Personal has naming rights, and the expanded competition is referred to as Personal Super Rugby.
In Japan, real estate developer Mitsubishi Estate acquired naming rights in 2018, the competition referred to as Mitsubishi Estate Super Rugby. The competition had no title sponsor in Japan during the 2016 and 2017 seasons.

Competition records

Team records

Single match
 Highest score: 96 points – Crusaders defeated Waratahs 96–19, 2002
 Lowest score: 0 points –   Reds defeated Hurricanes 11–0, 1999; Brumbies defeated Bulls 15–0, 1999; Sharks defeated Bulls 29–0, 1999; Brumbies defeated Cats 64–0, 2000; Highlanders defeated Bulls 23–0, 2005; Blues defeated Brumbies 17–0, 2006; Brumbies defeated Reds 36–0, 2007; Crusaders defeated Western Force 53–0, 2008; Crusaders defeated Stormers 22–0, 2009; Highlanders defeated Crusaders 6–0, 2009; Stormers defeated Highlanders 33–0, 2011; Waratahs defeated Rebels 43–0, 2011; Crusaders defeated Bulls 27–0, 2011; Brumbies defeated Reds 29–0, 2015; Sharks defeated Kings 53–0, 2016; Hurricanes defeated Sharks 41–0, 2016; Crusaders defeated Highlanders 17–0, 2017; Lions defeated Waratahs 29–0, 2018; Highlanders defeated Sunwolves 52–0, 2019; Brumbies defeated Sunwolves 33–0, 2019; Crusaders defeated Rebels 66–0, 2019; Stormers defeated Hurricanes 27–0, 2020; Stormers defeated Bulls 13–0, 2020
 Highest combined score: 137 points – Chiefs defeated Lions 72–65, 2010
 Lowest combined score: 6 points – Highlanders defeated Crusaders 6–0, 2009
 Highest winning margin: 89 points – Bulls defeated Reds 92–3, 2007
 Highest score away:  83 points – Hurricanes defeated Sunwolves 83–17, 2017
 Most tries in a match by one team: 14 by Crusaders (v Waratahs), 2002; 14 by Lions (v Sunwolves), 2017
 Most tries in a match by both teams: 18 by Lions and Chiefs, 2010

Season or streak
 Most consecutive wins: 16 wins – Crusaders, 2018–19
 Most consecutive losses in a season: 13 losses – Lions, 2010
 Most consecutive losses: 17 losses – Lions, 15 May 2009 to 12 March 2011
 Most tries in a season: 97 tries – Hurricanes, 2017
 Fewest tries in a season: 13 tries – Lions, 2007
 Most wins in the regular season: 14 wins – Stormers (2012); Hurricanes (2015); Crusaders (2017); Lions (2017)
 Most wins in a full season: 17 wins – Crusaders (2017)
 Fewest wins in a season: 0 wins – Bulls, 2002, Lions, 2010 regular season
 Fewest losses in a season: 0 losses – Blues, 1997; Crusaders, 2002
 Most wins in a row at home: 36 wins – Crusaders 2018–2020
 Most points conceded in a season: 684 – Kings, 2016
 Largest points difference conceded in a season: 402 – Kings, 2016

Player records

Career
 Points: 1713 – Dan Carter, Crusaders
 Tries: 60 — Israel Folau, Waratahs;
 Conversions: 306 – Dan Carter, Crusaders
 Penalties: 322 – Dan Carter, Crusaders
 Quickest Try: 8 seconds – Bryan Habana, Stormers
 Consecutive Games: 104 – Caleb Ralph, Crusaders
 Most Caps: 202 – Wyatt Crockett, Crusaders

Season
 Points: 263 – Morné Steyn, Bulls, 2010
 Tries: 16 – Ben Lam, Hurricanes, 2018
 Conversions: 52 – Elton Jantjies, Lions, 2017
 Penalties: 51 – Morné Steyn, Bulls, 2010
 Drop Goals: 11 – Morné Steyn, Bulls, 2009

Match
 Points: 50 – Gavin Lawless, Sharks
 Tries: 5 – Sean Wainui, Chiefs
 Conversions: 13 – Andrew Mehrtens, Crusaders
 Penalties: 9 – Elton Jantjies, Lions
 Drop Goals: 4 – Morné Steyn, Bulls

Domestic competitions
Each respective country competing in Super Rugby has a number of their own domestic leagues, which feed into Super Rugby teams.

South Africa actually used their Currie Cup teams as opposed to creating new teams during the earlier years of the Super 12. However, the Currie Cup is now the third tier of rugby in South Africa, below Test and Super Rugby; it is played after the Super Rugby season, and all unions are aligned to a Super Rugby team, though it is mainly the big six, Blue Bulls, Golden Lions, Free State Cheetahs, Western Province and Eastern Province Elephants which contribute the most to the Super Rugby sides.

In New Zealand, the National Provincial Championship is the most prominent domestic competition below the Super Rugby, in which all the respective Unions are also aligned with Super Rugby sides.

In Australia, the National Rugby Championship (NRC) was launched in 2014. Several teams that played in the former Australian Rugby Championship in 2007, were revived for the NRC.

Argentina, until 2018, like South Africa and New Zealand, had a national championship where several provincial unions competed, the Campeonato Argentino. Another national championship, but for clubs, is Nacional de Clubes.

Japan's main domestic competition was the Japan Rugby League One (formerly Top League), featuring 16 clubs, while the second division, the Top Challenge League, featured 8 clubs.

Fiji's domestic competition is the Skipper Cup, featuring the countries top 12 provincial sides.

Media
Until 2020, in Australia, pay TV station Fox Sports showed every match live and beginning in 2016, free-to-air station Network Ten started showing a full match replay every Sunday morning of the 'Match of the Round' featuring at least one Australian team. Network Ten also showed full match replays of all finals matches featuring Australian teams. From 2021 onwards, Nine Network possesses the broadcasting rights, and any future Super Rugby seasons will have games aired live on streaming service Stan, with the potential for a number of games to be simulcast live on either Nine's flagship free-to-air channel or a multichannel, similar to the current situation with Super Rugby AU.

Super Rugby is broadcast on Supersport in South Africa and is simulcast terrestrially on M-Net. Sky Sport is the official broadcaster in New Zealand. Super Rugby was broadcast in over 40 countries — in the UK on Sky Sports; in Spain it is broadcast by Digital+, and in the United States by ESPN+, which has confirmed all matches will be broadcast live or on demand. In Canada, TSN broadcasts all matches only on TSN GO, their online SD streaming platform. Following the 2020 season though, broadcasting deals with European broadcasters ended, and no new deal had been arranged for the start of the 2021 season.

On 24 February 2021, RugbyPass announced streaming rights for the Super Rugby Aotearoa competition, to be streamed in all territories in the UK & Ireland, Europe, Asia and the Middle East, totalling 100 territories.

On 6 March 2021, World Rugby announced streaming for the Super Rugby AU competition, to be streamed in all territories in the UK & Ireland, Europe, Asia, and the Middle East, totalling over 100 territories.

On 19 March 2021, further broadcasters were announced for both competitions, with ESPN and ESPN International being announced as covering North and South America, Digicel covering the Pacific Islands and Papua New Guinea, Telefónica covering Spain and Wowow covering Japan.

On 13 May 2021, further broadcasters were announced for Super Rugby Trans-Tasman, with RugbyPass picking up streaming services in European territories again for the tournament. Canal+ was announced as covering France, ESPN Argentina covering the United States, Premier Sports covering Southeast Asia, Sky Italia covering Italy and TSN covering Canada.

On 14 February 2022, SANZAAR announced the launch of Sanzaarrugby.tv, a global streaming service for the Super Rugby competition to territories that don't have right holder broadcasters in place.

The current broadcasters ahead of the 2022 Super Rugby Pacific season are:

Broadcasters

See also

 List of Super Rugby champions
 List of Super Rugby stadiums
 SANZAAR
 Super Rugby Aotearoa
 Super Rugby AU
 Super Rugby Trans-Tasman
 Super Rugby Unlocked
 Super W
 Super Rugby Aupiki

References

Bibliography

External links

 

 
 
 
 
 
 
Rugby union competitions for provincial teams
Fox Sports (Australian TV network)
Recurring sporting events established in 1996
1996 establishments in Australia
1996 establishments in New Zealand
1996 establishments in South Africa
Sports leagues established in 1996
Rugby union
Professional sports leagues in New Zealand
Professional sports leagues in South Africa
Multi-national professional rugby union leagues
Multi-national professional sports leagues